The Welch O-2 is a light two-cylinder engine developed for the Welch OW-7M series of aircraft.

Specifications (O-2)

See also

References

External links
APM Welch OW-8

Boxer engines
1930s aircraft piston engines